José Roilo Solís Gólez (January 9, 1947 – June 11, 2018) was a Filipino politician who last served his sixth term as Member of the Philippine House of Representatives representing the Second District of Parañaque, one of the most industrialized districts of the Philippines. A veteran legislator, he was elected in 1992, 1995, 1998, 2004, 2007, and 2010 all by landslide victories and had served as Congressman for six terms: in the 9th, 10th, 11th, 13th, 14th, and 15th Congress of the Philippines.

Biography and career
Gólez was born on January 9, 1947, in the small town of Looc, Romblon in the Philippines. His father was a Philippine Naval Captain. He grew up in a low cost government housing project and was a product of public schools. Coming from a rural area, Gólez rose to success in academics, sports, government, business, civic organizations and politics.

Gólez went to the Philippine Military Academy and US Naval Academy at Annapolis, Maryland, where he graduated with a Bachelor of Science degree, major in mathematics and operations analysis. While at Annapolis, he distinguished himself in academics, leadership and sports. He was consistently in the Superintendent's Honor List. He was selected company commander, a high position in the Brigade of Midshipmen and was a brigade boxing champion for four straight years, establishing a record as the first to achieve this feat since the Academy was established in 1845. So far, only fourteen midshipmen have won four brigade boxing championships in the academy's history.

After Annapolis, Gólez took up Master in Business Administration (MBA) in the University of the Philippines where he graduated valedictorian of his class.

Gólez pursued a long career as a public servant:
 Three years as Postmaster General of the Philippines, where he received the prestigious Ten Outstanding Young Men Award (TOYM) for public service excellence.
 Three years as a member of the Philippine Cabinet, serving as National Security Adviser, overseeing the country's counterterrorism and national security program.
 Eighteen years as Congressman of the Republic of the Philippines. He had consistently received the award One of the Most Outstanding Congressmen of the Philippines, had a perfect 100% attendance record, no absence, in all the sessions of Congress since he became a congressman in 1992. He served his sixth term as Congressman  and won all his election victories by landslide, thus earning the title “Landslide King of Paranaque.” He had served as chairman of the Committee on Public Order & Security, chairman of the Committee on National Defense and as Deputy Minority Leader. Gólez was also credited for concreting the most number of roads and constructing the most number of school buildings in the history of Parañaque.
 Twenty years as governor of the Philippine National Red Cross, where he received the Bayani Red Cross Gold Medal Award for heroism and bravery in the face of gunfire while leading a Red Cross rescue team to rescue wounded soldiers during the bloody December 1989 coup attempt.
 One year as national president of the Boy Scouts of the Philippines.
 Two years as fund campaign chairman of the Philippine Cancer Society.
 Four years as division fund campaign chairman of the Philippine Tuberculosis Society.
 Two years as chairman of the Elks Cerebral Palsy Project.
 Four years as governor of the Management Association of the Philippines.
 Twenty-eight years as a Rotarian of the Rotary Club of Manila.
 Two years as national president of the Amateur Boxing Association of the Philippines.
 Two years as president of the Philippine Olympic Academy.
 Five years as a member of the board of trustees of the St. Luke's Medical Center.
 Fourteen years as a Philippine Navy officer, reaching the rank of navy captain (full colonel in the army).
 Four years as professor in the Master in Business Administration Program of the University of the Philippines.
 Four years as professor of management in the Asian Institute of Management.

Gólez had extensive experience in corporate affairs, having served as chief executive officer, chief operating officer, or board member in several major corporations in the field of shipbuilding, health products, fast foods, real estate, marketing, security equipment, telecommunications, banking, oil exploration and insurance.

He died on June 11, 2018, after suffering a heart attack and was laid to rest at The Heritage Park in Taguig.

References

Official links
Official Blog of Congressman Roilo Golez

See also
Congress of the Philippines
House of Representatives of the Philippines

1947 births
2018 deaths
People from Romblon
People from Parañaque
Liberal Party (Philippines) politicians
Members of the House of Representatives of the Philippines from Parañaque
National Security Advisers of the Philippines
Arroyo administration cabinet members
Academic staff of the University of the Philippines
Academic staff of the Asian Institute of Management
Philippine Military Academy alumni
United States Naval Academy alumni
University of the Philippines alumni
Burials at The Heritage Park